Motor Racing Network (MRN) is a U.S. radio network that syndicates broadcasts of auto racing events, particularly NASCAR. MRN was founded in 1970 by NASCAR founder Bill France, Sr. and broadcaster Ken Squier, and is a wholly owned subsidiary of NASCAR. Its first broadcast was the 1970 Daytona 500.

MRN is one of the two main radio broadcasters of the NASCAR Cup Series and Xfinity Series, covering events held at tracks owned by NASCAR, along with Pocono Raceway. It also broadcasts the NASCAR All-Star Race, and the entire Truck Series season (although clearance of Xfinity and Truck Series events may vary by station). Almost all of the remaining Cup and Xfinity races are broadcast by the Speedway Motorsports-owned Performance Racing Network (PRN), besides the Brickyard 400 (which is broadcast by the Indianapolis Motor Speedway Radio Network in association with PRN); many stations have affiliations with both MRN and PRN in order to air a full NASCAR schedule. All races are also carried on Sirius XM NASCAR Radio.

In addition to NASCAR races, MRN broadcasts the majority of the ARCA Menards Series and once had exclusive coverage of the United SportsCar Championship (IMSA now does the radio broadcasts) and Formula One, including the United States Grand Prix, which returned in the 2012 season at the Circuit of the Americas in Austin, Texas and offers other race related programs.

The MRN flagship station is WNDB, which serves Daytona Beach, Florida. The network headquarters moved near Charlotte, North Carolina in 2008.

Programs
While MRN's primary role is doing radio broadcasts of NASCAR races, they also produce daily radio programs that are carried by some of their affiliates. They also stream the programs on their website and offer most shows as a podcast on Apple iTunes.

Busch Pole Updates (Short reports broadcast during Monster Energy NASCAR Cup Series qualifying; full event broadcast available on some affiliates, SiriusXM Satellite Radio and through NASCAR.com's "Track Pass" subscription service).
NASCAR Today (Twice daily three-minute reports, one around noon and one late afternoon/early evening with the hosts of MRN Outloud!).
MRN Outloud! (Extended review of the past weekend's racing action with Woody Cain and Joey Meier). Podcast
Rip The Fence (Former Voices of USAC Dillon Welch and Tyler Burnett talk Silver Crown, Midgets and Traditional Non-Winged Sprint Car Racing). Podcast
American Racing Snobs (Eric Morse and Tony Rizzuti discuss the world of racing with an emphasis on the Formula 1 World Championship, plus other disciplines such as IndyCar and IMSA). Podcast
Sunday Money (NASCAR Cup Series driver Corey LaJoie, FOX Sports personality Daryl Motte and MRN's own Lauren Fox bring you tales from both on and off the racetrack). Podcast
Winged Nation (Winged sprint car news and interviews hosted by  Erin Evernham and Steve Post). Podcast
NASCAR Live (Tuesday evening call-in show hosted by Mike Bagley). Podcast
MRN Crew Call (Motor Racing Network Host Rocko Williams talks to the guys that sit atop the pit boxes and jump over the wall). Podcast
The Straightline (NHRA news and interviews hosted by Doug Herbert and Ralph Sheheen). Podcast
NASCAR Coast to Coast (NASCAR local, regional and international talk with Hannah Newhouse and Kyle Rickey). Podcast
MRN Classic Races (Rebroadcasts of classic races (formerly known as Flashback Friday and Throwback Thursday)). Podcast
Ned Jarrett's World of Racing (Two-minute weekday morning commentary by two-time Grand National Series champion and former MRN pit reporter Ned Jarrett, hosted by Suzy Armstrong).

Three MRN announcers also host daily call-in shows on Sirius XM NASCAR Radio channel 90 year round. Mike Bagley and Pete Pistone co-host The Morning Drive Monday through Friday from 7:00 to 11:00 a.m. Eastern time. Dave Moody hosts Sirius XM Speedway from 3:00 to 7:00 p.m. Monday through Friday. Moody was also the first NASCAR personality to host a show on satellite radio back in 2003 on Sirius Satellite Radio despite the fact NASCAR races and other NASCAR-related shows were exclusively on XM Satellite Radio. This changed on January 1, 2007 when MRN's Barney Hall announced the launch of Sirius XM NASCAR Radio on Sirius XM.

Affiliate stations
MRN has about 600 affiliate stations, including:

 Alabama

 Birmingham: WYDE / WXJC-FM

 Arizona

 Phoenix: KGME

 Delaware

 Dover: WDSD

 Florida

 Daytona Beach: WNDB / WKRO-FM
 Miami/Fort Lauderdale/West Palm Beach: WMIA-FM 93.9 HD2

 Iowa

 Decorah: KVIK

 Kentucky

 Lexington: WLXO

 Michigan

 Detroit: WDFN

 Minnesota

 Buffalo: KRWC

 Missouri

 Kansas City: WHB

 New Hampshire

 Lebanon: WXXK

 New York

 Newark: WACK, WUUF

 North Carolina

 Charlotte: WEND

 Ohio

 Cincinnati: WSAI
 Cleveland: WWGK / WKNR
 Newark: WCLT-FM

 Texas

 Dallas: KRLD (AM) / KRLD-FM

 Virginia

 Bristol: WFHG / WXBQ-FM
 Richmond: WRNL, WRVA-AM
 Norfolk: WTAR (except during Washington Commanders seasons in September–November)

Announcers

Current

Booth announcers

Cup
Alex Hayden (Lead booth announcer, 2019–present)
Jeff Striegle (booth announcer, 2013–present)
Rusty Wallace (booth announcer, 2015–present)
Todd Gordon (booth announcer, 2022-present)

Xfinity and Trucks
(For Companion Races; Alex Hayden, Jeff Striegle, Steve Post, Dave Moody and Mike Bagley Rotate Week to Week)
Kurt Becker (Stand-Alone Booth Announcer)
Dan Hubbard (Stand-Alone Booth Announcer)
Kyle Rickey (Stand-Alone Booth Announcer)

Turn announcers

Cup
Dave Moody (Turn announcer, 1987–present, Lead turn announcer 2001–present, host of Sirius XM Speedway)

Dave Moody primarily works turns 1 and 2 at most tracks (i.e. Daytona and Talladega), the backstretch at the short tracks (Martinsville and the September Richmond race (Mike Bagley works the April race), turn 1 at Pocono and the esses at Watkins Glen. When the Truck and Cup Series share a weekend at an SMI venue (except for the All-Star Race), Dave Moody works the booth for the Truck race.  This occurs during both Las Vegas Motor Speedway races.

Mike Bagley (Turn announcer, 1992–present, Fill in booth announcer, co-host of The Morning Drive)

Mike Bagley primarily works turns 3 and 4 at most tracks, the backstretch at Dover, turn 2 at Pocono, and the backstretch at Daytona and Talladega.  He has been used by NBC Sports in a similar rule since 2017 at Watkins Glen International and Indianapolis Motor Speedway in 2018 (Indianapolis is technically an SMI venue for radio purposes, as SMI's radio network works that race).

Both men also work these same positions for the Xfinity and Truck Series when they share the same track and weekend with the Cup Series as well as standalone Xfinity and Truck races (usually road course races that aren't shared with the Cup Series (like Mid-Ohio).

Standalone races/fill-in as needed
Kyle Rickey (Turn Announcer) (Primary 3rd Turn Announcer at Daytona, Talladega, Pocono and Watkins Glen)
Dan Hubbard (Lead West Coast Turn announcer, Stand-Alone Events Booth Announcer)
Kurt Becker (Turn announcer)
Chris Wilner (Turn announcer)
Tim Catafalmo (Turn announcer)
Eric Morse (Turn announcer)
Tony Bokhoven (Turn announcer)

Pit reporters

Cup
Steve Post (Pit reporter, co-host of Winged Nation).
Kim Coon (Social Media/Garage reporter; Co-Host of NASCAR Live Today Pre-Race Show)
Dillon Welch (Pit reporter, Also Fill In Turn Announcer; son of Fox NASCAR pit reporter Vince Welch;  part-time, as he will do some NBC Sports INDYCAR coverage to replace Marty Snider and Kelli Stavast when NBC's half of NASCAR begins)

Standalone/fill-in as needed
Woody Cain (Pit reporter, turn announcer, NASCAR Today (daily news show) producer/host, also Co-Host of NASCAR Live Pre-Race Show)
Jason Toy (Pit Reporter and Turn announcer)
Hannah Newhouse (Pit reporter)
Pete Pistone (Pit reporter, lead writer at MRN.com, co-host of The Morning Drive)
Brienne Pedigo (Pit reporter)
Georgia Henneberry (Pit reporter)
Glenn Jarrett (Pit reporter)
Winston Kelley (Pit reporter)

Former

Adam Alexander (Pit reporter 2000-2006, Current lead broadcaster for the Xfinity Series races on Fox).
Fred Armstrong (Turn announcer, Later Production Director).
Rick Benjamin 
Allen Bestwick (Turn announcer 1988-95, lead booth announcer 1996-2000, fill-in booth announcer for 2003 Speedweeks, was lead announcer for NASCAR coverage on ABC and ESPN, formally worked IndyCar races covered by ABC, plus covers college football and college basketball for ESPN. Previously was a race announcer then pit reporter for NASCAR on NBC and NASCAR on TNT).
Bill Bowser (Turn announcer, fill-in booth and pit reporter 1970-1991)
Russell Branham (Garage reporter for Daytona races, now a director at HB&M Sports in Charlotte, NC).
Dick Brooks (Pit reporter, died in 2006).
Kenny Campbell (Fill-in booth announcer, 1970s)
Dave Despain (Turn announcer in the 1970s, worked on ESPN and CBS racecasts in the 1980s-90s.  Hosted ESPN's NASCAR 2day pre-race show from 1994-2000, Wind Tunnel from 2003-2013 and NASCAR Inside Nextel Cup from 2005-2007 on Speed; formally hosted The Dave Despain Show on MAVTV).
Fritz Duda (turn announcer; operated the now defunct Riverside International Raceway and turned it into a shopping mall)
Mark Garrow (Now booth announcer for PRN).
Eli Gold (co-anchor, turn announcer, pit reporter, formally the host of NASCAR Live; resigned in 2016).
Barney Hall (Booth announcer, retired in 2014 after 44 years involved in MRN, died in 2016).
Ned Jarrett (Former color analyst for CBS Sports's and ESPN's NASCAR coverage).
Mike Joy (Turn announcer 1976-1979, co-anchor and exec producer 1980-84, pit reporter 1985-87. Broadcast NASCAR on TV for CBS, ESPN, TBS, TNN, SETN, MRN. Lead announcer for Fox Sports' NASCAR coverage 2001–present).
Bob Jenkins (Turn announcer in the late 1970s, worked NASCAR telecasts for ESPN for 1981-2000 and IndyCar Series races for NBCSN from 2009-2012, worked the Public Address system at the Indianapolis Motor Speedway from 2011-2020, died in 2021)
Paul Page (Turn announcer 1977 Michigan, IndyCar on NBC, ABC, ESPN, Host Play by Play of the Indianapolis 500 1977-2004 and 2014-2016)
Dustin Long (Pit reporter and MRN.com writer, now at NBC Sports)
Ford Martin (Turn announcer)
Mike Massaro (Was a host of ESPN2's NASCAR Now, former pit reporter on ESPN/ABC's coverage and NASCAR on NBC, former NASCAR reporter for SportsCenter).
Gary Montgomery (pit reporter)
Joe Moore (Former Lead booth announcer, 2001-2018, co-host of Raceline on MAV TV
Rick Lewis (Studio announcer, died in 2001).
Jerry Punch (Former lead announcer for ESPN/ABC's NASCAR coverage, pit reporter for the networks).
Jim Phillips (Former pit reporter and host of NASCAR USA).
Tony Rizzuti (Former Pit Reporter 1995-2018, FOX Sports pit reporter 2008-2012, FS1 NASCAR RaceHub 2013-2015, Raceline)
Charlie Roberts (Founder of MotorNet radio, TV pit announcer on Superstation WTBS, and track announcer at Daytona, Pocono, Dover Downs, and Wall Stadium.)
Dave Sutherland (Turn announcer in the 1980s, now primary announcer at Monadnock Speedway).
Ken Squier (CBS Sports' Motorsports editor. Anchored CBS Daytona 500 coverage from 1979-1997).
Hermie Sadler (Pit reporter for the 2000 spring Richmond race).
Jim Tretow (Turn announcer - Road America stand alone Xfinity races only)

References

External links

NASCAR on the radio
Sports radio networks in the United States
1970 establishments in Florida